Fierce People is a 2005 independent drama thriller film adapted by Dirk Wittenborn from his 2002 novel of the same name. Directed by Griffin Dunne, it starred Diane Lane, Donald Sutherland, Anton Yelchin, Kristen Stewart, and Chris Evans. The film explores many facets of family and societal dysfunction, including drug abuse, mental illness, and rape.

Plot
Trapped in his drug-dependent mother's apartment, 16-year-old Finn Earl wants nothing more than to escape New York City. He wants to spend the summer in South America studying the Ishkanani Indians (known as the "Fierce People") with his anthropologist father whom he's never met. Finn's plan changes after he is arrested when he buys drugs for his mother, Lower East Side Liz, who works as a massage therapist. Determined to get their lives back on track, Liz moves the two of them into a guesthouse for the summer on the country estate of her ex-client, the aging billionaire, Ogden C. Osbourne.

In Osbourne's world of privilege and power, Finn and Liz encounter the super rich, a tribe portrayed as fiercer and more mysterious than anything the teenager might find in the South American jungle. 

While Liz battles her substance abuse and struggles to win back her son's love and trust, Finn falls in love with Osbourne's granddaughter, Maya Langley. He befriends her older brother, Bryce Langley; and wins the favor of Osbourne. When rape and violence ends Finn's acceptance within the Osbourne clan, the promises of this world quickly sour. Both Finn and Liz, caught in a harrowing struggle for their dignity, discover that membership in a group comes at a steep price.

Cast

Production
The inspiration for the novel on which the film is based is author Dirk Wittenborn’s experiences growing up in a modest household and feeling like an outsider among the super rich in an upper-crust New Jersey enclave.

Portions of the film were shot on location in British Columbia, Canada at Hatley Castle.

Reception

Box office
The film first premiered at the Tribeca Festival on April 24, 2005. It later received a limited release in 2007 and grossed $85,410 at the box office in the US.

Critical response
Fierce People earned negative reviews.

On Rotten Tomatoes the film has an approval rating of 24% based on reviews from 45 critics. The site's consensus states, "Fierce Peoples premise of a teenager studying rich people like animals is grating and self-satisfied, and Anton Yelchin's smug performance makes the film even harder to agree with."
On Metacritic the film has a score of 54% based on reviews from 15 critics, indicating "mixed or average reviews".

References

External links
 
 
 
 

2005 films
2000s thriller drama films
American coming-of-age films
American independent films
2005 independent films
American thriller drama films
Canadian thriller drama films
English-language Canadian films
2000s Tagalog-language films
Films directed by Griffin Dunne
Films based on American novels
Films set in New Jersey
Films shot in Vancouver
Films shot in New Jersey
Lionsgate films
Films about dysfunctional families
Films about rape
2005 drama films
Films about drugs
Films about the upper class
Films about mother–son relationships
2000s American films
2000s Canadian films